Yelena Vasilyevna Chebukina (born 11 October 1965) is a former volleyball player, who was a member of the Soviet national team that won the gold medal at the 1988 Summer Olympics.

In the 1990s, Chebukina played for Russia and then the Croatia women's national volleyball team.

She started to play in the Italian Volleyball League in 1992 with Irina Smirnova Ilchenko for Impresem Agrigento, ended third in the regular season. 
During the season 1993-94 she played for PVF Latte Rugiada Matera. With the team PVF Latte Rugiada Matera she won the European Super Cup in 1993, the Italian Cup and the Italian Championship in 1994.
Later on, the following years, she also played for Tradeco Altamura. In 1999 with Foppapedretti Bergamo she won the Italian Super Cup and the Champions League in 2000. 
She ended her career playing for Despar Perugia from 2000 to 2002.

References 

 

1965 births
Living people
Sportspeople from Almaty
Soviet women's volleyball players
Kazakhstani women's volleyball players
Russian women's volleyball players
Croatian women's volleyball players
Russian emigrants to Croatia
Volleyball players at the 1988 Summer Olympics
Volleyball players at the 1992 Summer Olympics
Volleyball players at the 2000 Summer Olympics
Olympic volleyball players of the Soviet Union
Olympic volleyball players of the Unified Team
Olympic volleyball players of Croatia
Olympic silver medalists for the Unified Team
Olympic gold medalists for the Soviet Union
Olympic medalists in volleyball
Medalists at the 1992 Summer Olympics
Medalists at the 1988 Summer Olympics
Honoured Masters of Sport of the USSR
Competitors at the 1986 Goodwill Games
Competitors at the 1990 Goodwill Games
Goodwill Games medalists in volleyball
Croatian people of Russian descent
Naturalized citizens of Croatia